Short Waves Festival is an annual international short film festival held in Poznań, Poland. Its main characteristic is inclusion of not only live-action, documentary and animated films, but also music videos, experimental films and video-art. It is one of the main events of its kind in Poland. The event's slogan hails it as "the most concise short film festival".

History
Since its commencement, the festival is organized by the Ad Arte Foundation from Poznań. Short Waves started as a multi-location event held simultaneously in various cities. The first edition in 2009 encompassed 28 locations in Poland, as well as Berlin, London and Dublin. Twelve Polish short films were screened in every city and the viewers voted for their favorite. The winner was chosen by counting the total number of votes from all the locations. In the next years the number of participating cities and countries increased. The record 2015 edition had more than 90 towns on 6 continents. Both the 2014 and 2015 editions consisted of two parts: Grand Prix Tour continued the tradition of organizing screenings around the globe, and Short Waves Poznań was a stationery version of the festival, with numerous screenings and events added. International competition was introduced next to the Polish one. The 2016 edition was the last to include the multiple location tour. Since then, the festival is held exclusively in Poznań and its multi-city incarnation is abandoned. The festival in its new format began to flourish with multiple new screening sections and competitions (such as Poznań Open, Dances with Camera, Urban View, Best of Seven), specialized workshops (for example movie poster making), discussion panels and other industry events.

Awarded films

2009

2010

2011

2012

2013

2014

2015

2016

2017

2018

2019

References

External links 
Official Festival Website

Film festivals in Poland